The 2013–14 Utah State Aggies men's basketball team represented Utah State University in the 2013–14 NCAA Division I men's basketball season. This was head coach Stew Morrill's 16th season at Utah State. The Aggies played their home games at the Smith Spectrum and this was their first year as a member of the Mountain West Conference. They finished the season 18–14, 7–11 in Mountain West play to finish in a tie for eighth place. They advanced to the quarterfinals of the Mountain West Conference tournament where they lost to San Diego State.

Departures

Recruiting

Roster

Schedule

|-
!colspan=9 style="background:#003366; color:#FFFFFF;"| Exhibition

|-
!colspan=9 style="background:#003366; color:#FFFFFF;"| Regular season

|-
!colspan=9 style="background:#003366; color:#FFFFFF;"| Mountain West tournament

References 

Utah State Aggies
Utah State Aggies men's basketball seasons
Aggies
Aggies